Ilyas bey Allahyar bey oglu Aghalarov (1860 – 1913), was a Russian-Azerbaijani military officer, and a colonel serving in the Russian Imperial Army.

Early life 
Ilyas bey Aghalarov was born on 7 June 1860, in Yelisavetpol (modern-day Ganja), then part of the Russian Empire. Born into an influential bey family, he received his general education at the 2nd Moscow Military Gymnasium.

Military service 
Aghalarov began his military service in September 1879 as an ordinary cadet at the Pavel Military School. On 8 August 1881, he started serving in the Erivan 13th Grenadier Regiment as a second lieutenant. On 10 May 1883, Aghalarov was transferred to the 3rd Caucasian Sapper Battalion of the Caucasian Sapper Brigade. On 8 August 1885, he was promoted to a lieutenant. From October 1892 to November 1894, Aghalarov commanded a company. He served as a staff captain from 1 August 1894. Four years later, on 1 August 1898, he was promoted to captain.

Aghalarov took part in the Russo-Japanese War. On 26 June 1904, he was promoted to lieutenant colonel with the appointment to the 1st East Siberian Military Telegraph Company of the newly formed East Siberian Telegraph Battalion. Returning from Port Arthur, Aghalarov continued his service in the 2nd Caucasian Combat Engineer Battalion of the 2nd Caucasian Army Corps. He became a colonel in 1911 and received seniority on 6 December 1910.

On 18 March 1913, Ilyas bey Aghalarov died a result of a suddenly exploding shell. He was buried in Elisabethpol, in the courtyard of the Goy Imam Mosque.

Awards 
 Order of Saint Anna 3rd degree. (1893)
 Order of Saint Stanislaus, 2nd degree. (1901)
 Order of Saint Vladimir 4th class with swords and bow. (1906)
 Order of St. Anne 2nd class with swords.

References 

1860 births
People from Ganja, Azerbaijan
1913 deaths
Azerbaijani colonels
Imperial Russian Army personnel
Russian military personnel of the Russo-Japanese War
Recipients of the Order of St. Vladimir, 4th class
Recipients of the Order of St. Anna, 2nd class
Recipients of the Order of St. Anna, 3rd class
Recipients of the Order of Saint Stanislaus (Russian), 2nd class
Deaths by explosive device